Science Ninja Team Gatchaman is a Japanese animated franchise and 1972 TV series.

Gatchaman may also refer to:

 Science Ninja Team Gatchaman: The Movie, 1978
 Gatchaman (film), a 2013 film based on the TV show
Gatchaman II, a 1978 sequel to the original TV show
 Gatchaman Fighter a 1979 sequel 
Gatchaman (OVA), a 1994 original video animation

See also
 
 List of Gatchaman video games
 Battle of the Planets, a 1978 American adaptation of the Japanese anime series
G-Force: Guardians of Space a 1986 American adaptation
Eagle Riders, a 1996 American adaptation of Gatchaman II and Gatchaman Fighter

Gatchaman